The Secret of St. Ives is a 1949 American historical adventure film directed by Phil Rosen and starring Richard Ney, Vanessa Brown and Henry Daniell. It is adapted from the 1897 novel St. Ives by Robert Louis Stevenson. Set during the Napoleonic Wars, the film's plot follows a French officer who is captured and held as a prisoner in England. He manages to escape with the help of a local woman. The film was released by Columbia Pictures. The sets were designed by the art director Cary Odell.

Plot
Adaptation of the Robert Louis Stevenson's story of French prisoners in the Napoleonic wars who escape from Edinburgh Castle.

Cast
 Richard Ney as Anatole de Keroual 
 Vanessa Brown as Floria Gilchrist 
 Henry Daniell as Maj. Edward Chevenish 
 Edgar Barrier as Sgt. Carnac 
 Aubrey Mather as Daniel Romaine 
 Luis Van Rooten sa Clausel 
 John Dehner as Couguelat 
 Paul Marion as Amiot 
 Douglas Walton as Allan St. Ives 
 Jean Del Val as Count St. Ives 
 Phyllis Morris as Annie Gilchrist
 John Goldsworthy as General Ordney
 Gordon Richards as Prosecution Officer

References

Bibliography
 Goble, Alan. The Complete Index to Literary Sources in Film. Walter de Gruyter, 1999.

External links

1949 films
American historical adventure films
Films directed by Phil Rosen
Columbia Pictures films
Napoleonic Wars films
Films set in England
Films based on British novels
Films based on works by Robert Louis Stevenson
1940s historical adventure films
American black-and-white films
1940s English-language films
1940s American films